Gati Krushna Misra was the seventh Chief Justice of Orissa High Court, from 1 May 1969 to 30 October 1975. On 1 May 1969, he was elevated to the post of Chief Justice of Orissa High Court and worked as such for more than six years.

Professional life 
Born in the village of Gailo, in Dhenkanal district, he completed his primary education in the native village. In 1937, he got a Post Graduate Degree in Economics from Patna University and pursued his law course in Patna. He returned to Odisha and pursued his Law profession in 1940 in Cuttack. He was appointed Munsif in the Orissa Judiciary in 1940. He was promoted to the cadre of Sub Judge and served at various places of Odisha. But in 1950 he resigned from Government service and joined his profession. About twelve years thereafter, i.e. from 30 January 1962 he was elevated as an additional Judge of the Odisha High Court. From 1 May 1969 to 30 October 1975 he served as the Chief Justice of Orissa High Court.

While as Chief Justice, he served as the acting Governor of Odisha from 1 July 1972 to 8 November 1972 and from 21 August 1974 to 25 October 1974.

He died on 6 July 2009. He is survived by three sons and three daughters.

References

External links
 Orissa High Court

1992 deaths
Judges of the Orissa High Court
Governors of Odisha
People from Dhenkanal district
Patna University alumni
Chief Justices of the Orissa High Court
20th-century Indian judges